Nevenka Urbanova (Serbian Cyrillic: Невенка Урбанова, Stari Bečej, 28 March 1909 – Belgrade, 7 January 2007) was one of the most famous Serbian actresses.

Theatre
She passed the audition in 1925, in front of Milan Grol and Milan Kašanin and was admitted as a member of drama in the National Theatre in Belgrade. Made more than 150 roles, and in 1936 became a First Class Actor of the National Theatre. She worked at the National Theatre until retirement in 1959. She last appeared on stage on 21 April 1965, as a guest of the Yugoslav Drama Theatre, in the world premiere of Sławomir Mrożek's Tango. That day, on the scene of JDP, the ensemble cast consisted of: Ljubiša Jovanović, Blaženka Katalinić, Nevenka Urbanova, Snežana Nikšić, Slavko Simić and Nikola Simić and Marko Todorović.

Some of the major roles that she played are: 
Lola Montez (Enchanted King, by Todor Manojlović)
Baroness Kasteli – Glembaj (The Glembays, by Miroslav Krleža)
Rina (Pokojnik, by Branislav Nušić)
Mrs Erlynne (Lady Windermere's Fan, by Oscar Wilde)
Hester Collyer (The Deep Blue Sea, by Terence Rattigan)
Vaska (Koštana, by Bora Stanković)
Julia Lambert (Adorable Julia, by Alfred Weidenmann)
Claudine (George Dandin ou le Mari confondu, by Molière)
Serafina Delle Rose (The Rose Tattoo, by Tennessee Williams). and many more.

She was considered to be one of the most desirable and gorgeous Serbian actresses, before and after the Second World War. Among theatrologists and colleges, like her friend and BITEF selector, Jovan Ćirilov, she was much praised:

She was married to sculptor Dušan Jovanović († 1945), son of the Serbian royal photographer Milan Jovanović and the nephew of the painter Paja Jovanović. In 2002, Nevenka Urbanova donated two of her father's statues of King Petar I Karađorđević made by her husband to Prince Aleksandar of Serbia. That occasion was her last appearance in public.

Movies
Sve radi osmaha (1926),
Da sam ranije znala (1928),
Sofka (1948),
Sreća u torbi (1961),
Medallion with three heart (1962).

Book
In the last decades of her life, she wrote memoirs. In 2000 she published the book Fireflies that shine with letters, in her own edition (with the introductions of academics Dejan Medaković and director Miroslav Belović), and in 2006, the second edition (published by the National Theatre in Belgrade). During April and May 2006, in Belgrade University Library was the exhibition devoted to Hugo Klain, and during the lecture "Actors about director Hugo Klajn" on 4 May 2006, she participated in a written statement that was read by Predrag Ejdus.

Awards

Nevenka Urbanova was awarded the Serbian government for his role of Rina  in Nušić's "Pokojnik", then first prize at the Festival of Radio and TV dramas in the Ljubljana for radio mono-drama "Lipton tea" in 1964. One of the most prestigious Serbian acting awards "Dobričin prsten" received in 1984. One of the winners of the Academy Award Ivo Andrić for 2005. year.
In 1994. in the gallery of SANU opened the exhibition on the occasion of 125 anniversary of the National Theatre.

Trivia
 "Dušan Jovanović Đukin, Nevenka's husband devoted most of his life, and artistic life also, to being her companion and friend to the last breath. He dedicated his images to her with subtle colors, as his love for Nevenka was also subtle and gentle." (Jovan Ćirilov).
 When she died she was the oldest Serbian professional actor. According to her wish the news of her death was announced three days later, on 10 January, after the cremation and funeral. News of her death was announced on RTS news, on 10 January 2007.

References

External links

 
 Poland avant-garde drama in Yugoslavia (1945–1990)
 Nevenka Urban: Easter
 Žena od reči (information on gift to the Prince Aleksandar) 
 woman of words Nevenka Urbana Žena od reči (NIN, no. 2704th of 24 October 2002) 
 Academy Awards "Ivo Andric" in 2005. year 
 Dies Nevenka Urbanova, Theater Diva (Politika, 11 January 2007) 

1909 births
2007 deaths
People from Bečej
Serbian actresses
Serbian film actresses
20th-century Serbian women opera singers
Serbian stage actresses
Serbian television actresses
University of Arts in Belgrade alumni
Laureates of the Ring of Dobrica